Sanatorio de Muñecos is the second album by the Spanish heavy metal band Hamlet.

The band considered this album as "the real first album", because their previous album Peligroso had very bad production values and a heavy metal/hard rock sound. This release would include rap vocals, funk bass and guitars riffs from hardcore punk, groove metal, thrash metal, and alternative metal, and would reflect the sound the band would have live. The band moved in the summer of 1993 to Morrisound Studios in Tampa, Florida to have the album recorded by owner and producer Tom Morris.

This is the first album with drummer Paco Sánchez.

Track listing 
 Irracional
 Perdón por vivir
 Reza
 Ceremonia T.V.
 Qué voy a hacer
 Sacrificar (sacrifícame)
 Al Lado
 Coeficiente deprimente
 Quien
 Repulsa total
 Basta
 Eso sí lo haces bien
 Discriminación

Members 
J. Molly - Vocals
Luis Tárraga - Lead guitar
Pedro Sánchez - Rhythm guitar
Augusto Hernández - Bass, chorus
Paco Sánchez - Drums

Production credits 
Recorded in June, 1993 in Morrisound Studios, Tampa, FL., USA.
Mastered at Fullersound, Miami, Florida, USA.

Sources 
Info of the remastered version
Review on mirdalternativa.com
Info in zona-zero.net

1994 albums
Hamlet (band) albums